Charles, Karl or Carl Albrecht may refer to:

Entrepreneurs
Carl Albrecht (businessman) (1875–1952), German cotton merchant
Karl Albrecht (1920–2014), German founder of supermarket chain Aldi
Karl Albrecht Jr. (born 1948), German billionaire; son of Karl Albrecht

Musicians
Karl Franzevich Albrecht (1807–1863), German-Russian musician and composer
Charles Albrecht (1817–1895), Monegasque composer
Carl Albrecht, Scottish drummer and percussionist on 1990 album Amazing Love (Integrity)

Nobles
Karl Albrecht, Elector of Bavaria (1697–1745), Elector from 1726 and Charles VII, Holy Roman Emperor from 1742
Karl Albrecht I, Prince of Hohenlohe-Waldenburg-Schillingsfürst (1719–1793), ruler of German principality Hohenlohe-Waldenburg-Schillingsfürst; a/k/a Charles Albert
Karl Albrecht II, Prince of Hohenlohe-Waldenburg-Schillingsfürst (1742–1796), ruler of German principality Hohenlohe-Waldenburg-Schillingsfürst; a/k/a Charles Albert
Karl Albrecht III, Prince of Hohenlohe-Waldenburg-Schillingsfürst (1776–1843), ruler of German principality Hohenlohe-Waldenburg-Schillingsfürst; a/k/a Charles Albert
Archduke Karl Albrecht of Austria (1888–1951), Austrian-Polish landowner

Others
Carl Theodor Albrecht (1843–1915), German astronomer
Carl Albrecht (before 1870—after 1898), German-American journalist (Anzeiger des Westens#Later years)
Charles Albrecht (before 1875—after 1893), German cycling champion (UCI Motor-paced World Championships)
Carl Albrecht (psychologist) (1902–1965), German psychotherapist and physician
Carl Albrecht (politician) (born 1952), American politician from Utah

See also
Carl Albert (1908–2000), American politician
Carl Albert (musician) (1962–1995), American rock singer
Karl Albert (1921–2008), German philosopher
Charles Albert of Sardinia (1798–1849), King of Sardinia; a/k/a Carlo Alberto di Savoia
Carlo Alberto (disambiguation)